Stephen MacMahon  is one of the founders of the George Institute for Global Health, where currently holds the position of Principal Director. He also holds appointments as Professor of Cardiovascular Medicine at UNSW Sydney and Professor of Medicine at the University of Oxford, where he is an Oxford Martin Senior Fellow. He is an authority on the prevention and treatment of cardiovascular diseases, and for this work in this area, he has been elected to the Fellowship of the American College of Cardiology, the Australian Academy of Science, the British Academy of Medical Sciences, and the Australian Academy of Health and Medical Sciences.  In 2013, he was named EY Social Entrepreneur of the Year, and in 2015 he was named "One of the World's Most Influential Minds" by Thomson Reuters.  He was appointed Officer of the Order of Australia (AO) in the 2017 Queen's Birthday Honours.

References

External links 
 Official homepage at the George Institute
 MacMahon's page at the Martin School, Oxford University

Living people
Academics of the University of Oxford
Academic staff of the University of Sydney
Year of birth missing (living people)
Place of birth missing (living people)
Fellows of the Australian Academy of Science
Fellows of the Australian Academy of Health and Medical Sciences
Officers of the Order of Australia